Marla Hlady is a Canadian kinetic and sound artist who works in sculpture, drawing, sound and installation. She is a contemporary of Lois Andison, Simone Jones, Diane Landry and Daniel Olson.

Hlady's works are generally sculptural works and installations composed of everyday materials activated by electronic and mechanical systems, often reflecting the social systems that created them. Her works tend to follow a system-based approach to composition. Her major works include "Drumming Displaced into Different Sized Jam Jars", a large series of sculpture in the collection of The Art Gallery of Ontario, and "Waltzing Matilda", a kinetic sculpture that has exhibited extensively.

She has an MFA in sculpture (York University, 1990) and a BFA (1987) from University of Victoria.

Artistic career

Hlady first gained notice for her kinetic installation "neutralized feelings of apprehension," at G76 in Toronto, which was enthusiastically reviewed by Kate Taylor of The Globe and Mail. Her solo installation "Beauty" at the Koffler Gallery in Toronto, was curated by John Massier in 1992. After exhibiting her kinetic work "Waltzing Matilda" at Peregrine Gallery, which was reviewed by Gillian MacKay of the Globe and Mail, she had group and solo exhibitions at The Power Plant in Toronto. Her work "Drumming Displaced into Different Sized Jam Jars" was purchased by the Art Gallery of Ontario in 1999. In 2012 she had a major solo exhibition at Hallwalls in Buffalo, New York.

Hlady describes her studio practice as a play between content, form, functionality, and material, where material stands to mean as much what is heard as what is seen. Hlady is interested in the various relationships inherent in her work, from the relationships between the work, the space it occupies, and the ways the viewer interacts with the work in the space.

Awards
In 2002, she was nominated for the Sobey Art Award.

Major collections
Hlady's work is in the public collection of the Art Gallery of Ontario and the National Gallery of Canada.

Major exhibitions

 Neutralized Feelings of Apprehension, Gallery 76, Toronto, Ontario, 1991
 Beauty, Koffler Loggia Gallery, Toronto, Ontario, 1992
 Gallerie Christiane Chassay, Montreal, Quebec, 1993
 "Naked State: A Selected View of Toronto Art", The Power Plant, Toronto, Ontario, 1994
 Gallerie Christiane Chassay, Montreal, Quebec, 1995
 "Blink", The Power Plant, Toronto, Ontario, 1996
 Gallerie Christiane Chassay, Montreal, Quebec, 1997
 "Machines Festives", La Centrale, Montreal, Quebec, 1999
 The Power Plant, Toronto, Ontario, 2001
 The Gallery, University of Toronto at Scarborough, Toronto, Ontario, 2001
 Marla Hlady: Shelf Works, Neutral Ground, Regina, Saskatchewan, 2002
 Art Gallery of Calgary, Calgary, Alberta, 2003
 Owen's Art Gallery, Sackville, New Brunswick, 2004
 "The Idea of North", Iceland and Canada (touring), 2005
 Playing Piano, Gallery YYZ, Toronto, Ontario, 2008
 Marla Hlady: Rooms, Oakville Galleries, Oakville, Ontario, 2011
 Marla Hlady: Walls, Hallwalls Contemporary Arts Center, 2012

Works
 this abandoned house, 1991
 Neutralized Feelings of Apprehension, 1991
 Beauty, 1992
 off-roader 1, 1994
 Gut Machines, 1994–95
 Drumming Displaced into Different Sized Jam Jars, 1999
 Waltzing Matilda, 2000
 She Moves Through the Fair (Pipe Whistle), 2001
 Playing Piano, 2008

Publications

References
Web

Other

External links
 
 

Canadian women painters
Canadian sound artists
Women sound artists
Canadian multimedia artists
Artists from Edmonton
Living people
University of Victoria alumni
York University alumni
1965 births
21st-century Canadian women artists